The 12171 / 72 Lokmanya Tilak Terminus Haridwar AC Superfast Express is a Superfast Express train belonging to Indian Railways - Central Railway zone that runs between Lokmanya Tilak Terminus and Haridwar Junction in India.

It operates as train number 12171 from Lokmanya Tilak Terminus to Haridwar Junction and as train number 12172 in the reverse direction serving the states of Maharashtra, Madhya Pradesh, Uttar Pradesh, Delhi & Uttarakhand.

Coaches

The 12171 / 72 Lokmanya Tilak Terminus Haridwar AC Superfast Express has 1 AC 1st Class, 2 AC 2 tier, 15 AC 3 tier & 2 End on Generator coaches. It does not carry a Pantry car coach.

As is customary with most train services in India, Coach Composition may be amended at the discretion of Indian Railways depending on demand.

Service

The 12171 Lokmanya Tilak Terminus Haridwar AC Superfast Express covers the distance of 1771 kilometres in 29 hours 00 mins averaging  & in 29 hours 15 mins as 12172 Haridwar Lokmanya Tilak Terminus AC Superfast Express averaging .

As the average speed of the train is above , as per Indian Railways rules, its fare includes a superfast surcharge.

Routeing

The 12171 / 72 Lokmanya Tilak Terminus Haridwar AC Superfast Express runs from Lokmanya Tilak Terminus via Nasik Road, Bhusaval Junction, Bhopal Junction, Jhansi Junction, Hazrat Nizamuddin, Meerut City to Haridwar Junction.

Traction

The entire route is yet to be fully electrified. Earlier, a Kalyan based WCAM 3 engine would haul the train from Lokmanya Tilak Terminus up to Bhusaval Junction handing over to a Bhusaval based WAP 4 until Hazrat Nizamuddin after which a Tughlakabad based WDM 3A powers the train for the remainder of the journey.

With Central Railways progressively moving towards a complete changeover from DC to AC traction, it is now hauled by a Bhusaval based WAP 4 from Lokmanya Tilak Terminus until Hazrat Nizamuddin after which a Tughlakabad based WDM 3A powers the train for the remainder of the journey.

As the route has now been fully electrified, it is now an end to end haul by a Bhusaval based WAP 4. More recently, an Ajni/KALYAN(KYN) based Head on Generation enabled WAP 7 has been allocated to this train.

Timings

12171 Lokmanya Tilak Terminus Haridwar AC Superfast Express leaves Lokmanya Tilak Terminus every Monday & Thursday at 07:55 hrs IST and reaches Haridwar Junction at 13:10 hrs IST the next day.

12172 Haridwar Lokmanya Tilak Terminus AC Superfast Express leaves Haridwar Junction every Tuesday & Friday at 18:50 hrs IST and reaches Lokmanya Tilak Terminus at 23:45 hrs IST the next day.

References 

 https://www.youtube.com/watch?v=8bDOWyrU_5A
 https://www.youtube.com/watch?v=rdxdJwWoosk
 http://nr.indianrailways.gov.in/view_detail.jsp?lang=0&dcd=657&id=0,4,268
 http://www.desivideonetwork.com/view/5q388tq4u/ltt-haridwar-ac-superfast-express-overtakes-gorakhpur-express/

External links

Trains from Haridwar
Transport in Mumbai
Rail transport in Maharashtra
Rail transport in Madhya Pradesh
Rail transport in Delhi
AC Express (Indian Railways) trains